Patrick Cassidy may refer to: 
 Patrick Cassidy (actor) (born 1962), American actor in musical theatre and television
 Patrick Cassidy (composer) (born 1956), Irish composer of film soundtracks
 Patrick Cassidy (footballer) (1887–?), English professional footballer
 Patrick Sarsfield Cassidy (c. 1850–1903), Irish American journalist, poet and revolutionary
 Patrick F. Cassidy (1915–1990), United States Army officer